Michel Doublet (26 September 1939 – 18 August 2022) was a French politician, senator from 1989 to 2014 and mayor of Trizay. He represented the Charente-Maritime department and was a member of the Union for a Popular Movement.

References

External links
 

1939 births
2022 deaths
People from Rochefort, Charente-Maritime
Rally for the Republic politicians
Union for a Popular Movement politicians
The Republicans (France) politicians
Gaullism, a way forward for France
French Senators of the Fifth Republic
Senators of Charente-Maritime
Mayors of places in Nouvelle-Aquitaine